Henniker Sign Language was a village sign language of 19th-century Henniker, New Hampshire and surrounding villages in the US. It was one of three local languages which formed the basis of American Sign Language. Although the number of students from Henniker were fewer than speakers of the more famous Martha's Vineyard Sign Language, deafness in Henniker was genetically dominant, and Henniker SL was therefore likely to have been better developed than MVSL.

See also
Sandy River Valley Sign Language

References
Lane, Pillard, & French, "Origins of the American Deaf-World: Assimilating and Differentiating Societies and Their Relation to Genetic Patterning". In Emmorey & Lane, eds, The Signs of Language Revisited, 2000

Village sign languages
Sign languages of the United States
Extinct languages of North America
Extinct sign languages